Goodhue County is a county in the U.S. state of Minnesota. As of the 2020 census, the population was 47,582. Its county seat is Red Wing. Nearly all of Prairie Island Indian Community is within the county.

Goodhue County comprises the Red Wing, MN Micropolitan Statistical Area and is included in the Minneapolis-St. Paul, MN-WI Combined Statistical Area.

History
The county was created on March 5, 1853, with territory partitioned from Wabasha County. It was named for James Madison Goodhue (1810–1852), who published the first newspaper in the territory, The Minnesota Pioneer.

The county was originally settled exclusively by "Yankee" settlers, meaning that they both came to Goodhue County either directly from the six New England states or from upstate New York, where they were born to parents who had moved to that region from the six New England states in the immediate aftermath of the American Revolution, and that they were descended from the English Puritans who emigrated to North America during the early 1600s. Because of the prevalence of New Englanders and New England transplants from upstate New York the county was said to have a "distinctly New England character". While this was true of many neighboring counties it was considered exceptionally true of Goodhue County. The New Englanders brought with them many of their New England values, including a love of education and fervent support of the abolitionist movement. When the New Englanders arrived, they laid out farms, established post routes, and built schools and government buildings out of locally available materials. The New Englanders and their descendants made up the great majority of Goodhue County's inhabitants until the late 19th and early 20th century, when immigrants from Germany and Norway began arriving in the Minnesota-Wisconsin border region in large numbers. There were small numbers of immigrants from Germany, Norway and Sweden during the first several decades of Goodhue County's history as well.

Hamline University, Minnesota's first college of higher learning, was started in Red Wing in 1854. It closed during the Civil War, and reopened in 1869 in Saint Paul.

The county was a leading producer of wheat during the mid-19th century, and for several years the county boasted the highest wheat production in the country. Fires at two of Red Wing's mills in the 1880s and developing railroad routes across Minnesota encouraged farmers from neighboring counties to begin sending their wheat to Minneapolis mills, reducing the county's importance in the wheat trade around the start of the 20th century.

The first municipal swimming pool in the state was built in Goodhue County.

In October 1960, President Dwight D. Eisenhower visited the county for a bridge dedication ceremony. The Hiawatha Bridge had been built to replace the Old High Bridge that spanned the Mississippi River since 1895. This visit drew 20,000 people. Eisenhower hoped his visit would help in the elections, swaying Minnesota voters to vote for Richard Nixon in the 1960 presidential election in the coming month. But John F. Kennedy carried the state on his way to being elected the next president.

Geography

Goodhue County lies on Minnesota's border with Wisconsin (across Lake Pepin). The Cannon River flows eastward through the northern part of the county on its way to discharge into Lake Pepin. The Little Cannon River flows northward through the west-central part of the county, discharging into the Cannon River at Cannon Falls. The North Fork of the Zumbro River flows eastward through the lower part of the county. The county terrain consists of rolling hills, etched with drainages and gullies, and with high bluffs against the river valleys. The terrain slopes to the east and north; its highest point is near its southwest corner at 1,260' (384m) ASL. Goodhue is one of 17 Minnesota counties with more savanna soils than either prairie or forest soils.

Lakes

 Birch Lake
 Brewer Lake
 Cannon Lake
 Clear Lake
 Devils Lake
 Espen Lakes
 Goose Lake
 Lake Byllesby
 Larson Lake
 Nelson Lake
 North Lake
 Rattling Springs Lake
 Spring Banks Lake
 Spring Creek Lake
 Sturgeon Lake
 Twin Lakes

Major highways

  U.S. Highway 52
  U.S. Highway 61
  U.S. Highway 63
  Minnesota State Highway 19
  Minnesota State Highway 20
  Minnesota State Highway 56
  Minnesota State Highway 57
  Minnesota State Highway 58
  Minnesota State Highway 60
  Minnesota State Highway 246
  Minnesota State Highway 292
  Minnesota State Highway 316
 List of county roads

Adjacent counties

 Pierce County, Wisconsin - north
 Pepin County, Wisconsin - northeast
 Wabasha County - east
 Olmsted County - southeast
 Dodge County - south
 Rice County - west
 Dakota County - northwest

Protected areas

 Cannon River Turtle Preserve Scientific and Natural Area
 Frontenac State Park
 Miesville Ravine Park Reserve (part)
 North Fork Zumbro Woods Scientific and Natural Area
 Spring Creek Prairie Scientific and Natural Area
 Woodbury State Wildlife Management Area

Demographics

2000 census
As of the 2000 census, there were 44,127 people, 16,983 households, and 11,905 families in the county. The population density was 58.3/sqmi (22.5/km2). There were 17,879 housing units at an average density of 23.6/sqmi (9.12/km2). The racial makeup of the county was 96.57% White, 0.63% Black or African American, 0.98% Native American, 0.57% Asian, 0.03% Pacific Islander, 0.53% from other races, and 0.69% from two or more races. 1.07% of the population were Hispanic or Latino of any race.

There were 16,983 households, out of which 33.80% had children under the age of 18 living with them, 59.20% were married couples living together, 7.20% had a female householder with no husband present, and 29.90% were non-families. 25.20% of all households were made up of individuals, and 11.50% had someone living alone who was 65 years of age or older. The average household size was 2.53 and the average family size was 3.04.

The county population contained 26.50% under the age of 18, 7.40% from 18 to 24, 27.90% from 25 to 44, 23.20% from 45 to 64, and 15.00% who were 65 years of age or older. The median age was 38 years. For every 100 females there were 98.10 males. For every 100 females age 18 and over, there were 95.40 males.

The median income for a household in the county was $46,972, and the median income for a family was $55,689. Males had a median income of $36,282 versus $25,442 for females. The per capita income for the county was $21,934. About 3.70% of families and 5.70% of the population were below the poverty line, including 6.20% of those under age 18 and 8.60% of those age 65 or over.

2020 Census

Communities

Cities

 Bellechester (part)
 Cannon Falls
 Dennison (part)
 Goodhue
 Kenyon
 Lake City (part)
 Pine Island (part)
 Red Wing (county seat)
 Wanamingo
 Zumbrota

Census-designated place
 Frontenac

Unincorporated communities

 Belle Creek
 Belvidere Mills
 Bombay
 Claybank
 Forest Mills
 Hader
 Hay Creek
 Roscoe
 Ryan
 Skyberg
 Sogn
 Stanton
 Vasa
 Wacouta
 Wangs
 Wastedo
 Welch
 White Rock

Ghost towns
 Central Point Township
 Fairpoint
 Florence
 Thoten/Belvidere

Townships

 Belle Creek Township
 Belvidere Township
 Cannon Falls Township
 Cherry Grove Township
 Featherstone Township
 Florence Township
 Goodhue Township
 Hay Creek Township
 Holden Township
 Kenyon Township
 Leon Township
 Minneola Township
 Pine Island Township
 Roscoe Township
 Stanton Township
 Vasa Township
 Wacouta Township
 Wanamingo Township
 Warsaw Township
 Welch Township
 Zumbrota Township

Government and politics
Goodhue County usually leans Republican. It has selected the Republican nominee in nine of the eleven presidential elections since 1980.

See also
List of County Roads in Goodhue County, Minnesota
National Register of Historic Places listings in Goodhue County, Minnesota

References

External links
Goodhue County Government's website

 
Minnesota counties
Minnesota counties on the Mississippi River
1853 establishments in Minnesota Territory
Populated places established in 1853